Rozália Lelkes (née Tomann, born August 14, 1950, in Keszthely) is a former Hungarian handball player and coach. Among her achievements as club player is a Hungarian Cup and a Cup Winners' Cup title, as well as two silver medals in the Hungarian Championship. On international level she collected three bronze medals at the World Championships and also finished third at the Olympic Games in 1976.

Achievements

Club
Nemzeti Bajnokság I:
Runner-up: 1976, 1977
Magyar Kupa:
Winner: 1977
Runner-up: 1972, 1978
Cup Winners' Cup:
Winner: 1978
Finalist: 1979

International
Olympic Games:
Bronze Medalist: 1976
World Championship:
Bronze Medalist: 1971, 1975, 1978

References

 Kozák, Péter (1995). Ki kicsoda a magyar sportéletben?, vol. III. (S–Z). Szekszárd: Babits Kiadó. .

External links
Profile on Database Olympics

1950 births
Living people
Sportspeople from Keszthely
Hungarian female handball players
Handball players at the 1976 Summer Olympics
Handball players at the 1980 Summer Olympics
Olympic handball players of Hungary
Olympic bronze medalists for Hungary
Olympic medalists in handball
Medalists at the 1976 Summer Olympics